Simulamerelina is a genus of minute sea snails, marine gastropod mollusks or micromollusks in the family Rissoidae.

Species
Species within the genus Simulamerelina include:

 Simulamerelina caribaea (d’Orbigny, 1842)
 Simulamerelina corruga (Laseron, 1956)
 Simulamerelina didyma (Watson, 1886)
 Simulamerelina mauritiana (Martens, 1880)
 Simulamerelina novemstriata Faber & Moolenbeek, 2004

References

 Ponder W. F. (1985). A review of the Genera of the Rissoidae (Mollusca: Mesogastropoda: Rissoacea). Records of the Australian Museum supplement 4: 1-221 page(s): 49

Rissoidae
Taxa named by Winston Ponder